Denis Joseph Germain Stanislaus Brodeur (October 12, 1930 – September 26, 2013) was a Canadian photographer, acknowledged as one of hockey's finest photographers and was the father of New Jersey Devils goaltender Martin Brodeur, the National Hockey League's winningest goaltender. He was the official photographer for the Montreal Canadiens for many years, and co-published a book entitled Goalies: Guardians of the Net in 1996, which features his son Martin on the front cover.

Like his son, Denis was also considered an outstanding goaltender, and helped team Canada win the bronze medal at the 1956 Olympic Games in Cortina D'Ampezzo, Italy.

In November 2006 the National Hockey League acquired Brodeur's photography work, which consisted of over 110,000 images from 40 years. Some of the legendary names included in this collection are the brothers Phil and Tony Esposito, Jean Béliveau, Gordie Howe, Wayne Gretzky, Mario Lemieux and Bobby Orr. He also captured many famous events and landmarks, from the nasty Boston-Montreal rivalry of the 1970s right on up through the Devils' first Stanley Cup in 1995. His image was featured on a hockey card for the 2004–2005 Upper Deck Series One Hockey.

Personal
With his wife Mireille, Denis had three sons—Denis Jr., Claude, Martin—and two daughters—Line and Sylvie. Claude was a baseball pitcher in the Montreal Expos farm system.

On September 26, 2013, Brodeur died at age 82.

References

1930 births
2013 deaths
Artists from Montreal
Ice hockey people from Montreal
Canadian ice hockey goaltenders
Ice hockey players at the 1956 Winter Olympics
Medalists at the 1956 Winter Olympics
Olympic bronze medalists for Canada
Olympic ice hockey players of Canada
Olympic medalists in ice hockey
Sports photographers